Aliabad-e Pain or Aliabad Pain may refer to the following places in Iran:
 Aliabad-e Pain, East Azerbaijan
 Aliabad-e Pain, Marvdasht, Fars Province
 Aliabad-e Pain, Sepidan, Fars Province
 Aliabad-e Pain, Shiraz, Fars Province
 Aliabad-e Pain, Isfahan
 Aliabad-e Pain, Kerman
 Aliabad-e Pain, Anbarabad, Kerman Province
 Aliabad-e Pain, Zarand, Kerman Province
 Aliabad-e Pain, Kermanshah
 Aliabad-e Pain, Mazandaran
 Aliabad-e Pain, Razavi Khorasan
 Aliabad-e Pain, South Khorasan
 Aliabad-e Pain, Jolgeh-e Mazhan, South Khorasan Province

See also
 Aliabad-e Sofla (disambiguation)